Aircraft Accident Investigation Bureau may refer to:

 Aircraft Accident Investigation Bureau (India), a branch of the government of India
 Aircraft Accident Investigation Bureau (Switzerland), a former branch of the government of Switzerland
 Air Accident Investigation Bureau (disambiguation)